New Albany is a city in and the county seat of Union County, Mississippi, United States. According to the 2020 United States Census, the population was 7,626.

History
New Albany was founded in 1840 at the site of a grist mill and saw mill on the Tallahatchie River near the intersection of two Chickasaw trade trails. The town developed as a river port and as a regional center for agriculture and commerce.

During the Civil War the United States Calvary under Benjamin Grierson passed through New Albany on their way to raid Vicksburg, when they encountered confederate troops attempting to destroy the bridge over the Tallahatchie. The confederate troops fled and the bridge was preserved.

Union County was formed from parts of neighboring Lee, Pontotoc, and Tippah Counties in 1870, with New Albany designated as county seat. In the late 1880s two railroads the Kansas City, Memphis and Birmingham Railroad and the Gulf and Ship Island Railroad came to New Albany. In 2013, a section of railroad was paved to become the Tanglefoot Trail, following the path of a rail that was once operated by author William Faulkner's grandfather.

Lynching of L.Q. Ivy

In 1925 L. Q. Ivy, a 17 year old African American boy, was accused of assaulting a White woman, who said Ivy "might be" her attacker.
A crowd of 4,000 gathered in New Albany and despite efforts from the victim's father and US senator Hubert D. Stephens to prevent a lynching, the crowd gained control, torturing and killing Ivy.

Suicide of Ronnie McNutt

In 2020, Ronnie McNutt, an Iraq war veteran, committed suicide in New Albany on a Facebook Livestream. The case became notable for the video of his suicide being spread across social media platforms.

Geography

Demographics

2020 census

As of the 2020 United States Census, there were 7,626 people, 2,971 households, and 1,911 families residing in the city.

2010 census
As of the census of 2010, there were 8,526 people, 3,049 households, and 3,027 families residing in the city. The population density was 476.1 people per square mile (172.3/km). There were 3,329 housing units at an average density of 195.2 per square mile (75.4/km). The racial makeup of the city was 63.98% White, 32.98% African American, 0.17% Native American, 0.35% Asian, 1.54% from other races, and 0.97% from two or more races. Hispanic or Latino of any race were 2.83% of the population.

There were 3,049 households, out of which 31.3% had children under the age of 18 living with them, 45.0% were married couples living together, 17.3% had a female householder with no husband present, and 33.5% were non-families. 30.6% of all households were made up of individuals, and 14.3% had someone living alone who was 65 years of age or older. The average household size was 2.42 and the average family size was 3.02.

In the city, the population was spread out, with 26.3% under the age of 18, 8.8% from 18 to 24, 27.1% from 25 to 44, 20.5% from 45 to 64, and 17.4% who were 65 years of age or older. The median age was 36 years. For every 100 females, there were 86.3 males. For every 100 females age 18 and over, there were 78.1 males.

The median income for a household in the city was $28,730, and the median income for a family was $38,750. Males had a median income of $29,457 versus $20,579 for females. The per capita income for the city was $16,507. About 14.7% of families and 18.0% of the population were below the poverty line, including 22.0% of those under age 18 and 23.3% of those age 65 or over.

Education
From it's inception until 1964, a segregated school system was maintained, with one set of schools for White students and another for Black students. In 1901, the first school building dedicated entirely to public education was built with 18 classrooms. The only high school in Union County for Black students was Union County Training School in New Albany. Lie other chools for African-American students, the Training School was not government funded. In 1964, the school system began a slow process of integrating between the races. Elementary schools were integrated first, then higher grades were added. Integration completed in 1970, and at that time African American students made up 29 percent of the district’s students, and 20 percent of faculty.

Almost all of the city of New Albany is served by the New Albany School District while small portions are in the Union County School District.

The city is the location of a satellite campus of Northeast Mississippi Community College located at 301 North Street.

The New Albany High School Bulldogs boys basketball team won consecutive state Class 3A titles in 1985, 1986, and 1987. Former NBA player John Stroud coached the 1987 team.

Infrastructure

Transportation 
New Albany is bisected by Interstate 22 (US Highway 78).

New Albany is connected to Ripley in the North and Pontotoc to the South by State Highway 15. Highway 30 connects New Albany and Oxford to the West and Booneville to the Northeast, although when traveling from Oxford towards Booneville an alternate route must be taken within the city limits.

New Albany is served by BNSF Railway (formerly St. Louis – San Francisco Railway) and the Ripley and New Albany Railroad (formerly Gulf, Mobile and Ohio). The two railroads cross downtown. A portion of rail has been paved to become the Tanglefoot Trail, the longest rail-trail in Mississippi.

New Albany was once a stop for Gulf, Mobile and Ohio's famous "Rebel" streamlined passenger train.

The town serves as the northern terminus of the Tanglefoot Trail, a major rail-trail within the state.

Notable people
Robert F. Boyd, physician, teacher, politician
Jack Carlisle, football coach
Milt Crain, football player
Sam Creekmore IV, politician
Willie Daniel, football player
William Faulkner, Nobel Prize-winning author
Marcus Green, football player
Napoleon Hayes, musician
Bobby Hogue, politician
Doc Marshall, baseball player
Ronnie McNutt, U.S. Army Veteran
Ethan Paquin, poet
Steve Patterson, politician
John Pennebaker, politician
Estus Pirkle, Baptist minister and filmmaker
Matthew Prater, musician
Mike Ratliff, basketball player
Stephanie Saul, journalist
Hubert D. Stephens, U.S. senator from Mississippi
John Stroud, basketball player
Channing Ward, football player
Eli Whiteside, catcher and coach for the San Francisco Giants
Bettie Wilson, woman who lived to 115
Mike Wilson, politician

See also
 Brices Cross Roads National Battlefield

References

Cities in Mississippi
Cities in Union County, Mississippi
County seats in Mississippi